New Horizons Film Festival (previously: Era New Horizons; pl: Nowe Horyzonty) is an international film festival held annually in July in Wrocław, Poland. It has been organised since 2001. It is one of the biggest and most popular film festivals in Poland. Since 2008 it is accredited by FIAPF with an "avant-garde" specialised competitive status.

The event is organized by the Stowarzyszenie Nowe Horyzonty (New Horizons Association). The moving spirit and the director of the festival is Roman Gutek. T-Mobile mobile phone network operator was a nominal sponsor of the event until 2017.

Festival presents mainly arthouse cinema. The most important from the several competitions held at the festival (including new Polish films, films-on-art and short films contests) is the "New horizons international competition". It aims to present bold, unconventional and uncompromising films that are searching for the new forms of expression – "the new horizons of cinema". Prizes in the competition are: the Grand Prix, special mentions, and Audience Award. Since 2010 also a FIPRESCI Award is awarded.

Another important sections of the event are: retrospectives of the greatest film authors, experimental filmmakers and national cinemas, panorama of the most important auteur films of the season, "Midnight madness", and thematic sections.

Festival history 

After the first edition, organized in Sanok, the Festival was moved to Cieszyn, where it was held four times between 2002 and 2005. From 2006 the event takes place in Wrocław. Since then it has apparently spread and now it is frequented by number of cinephiles and hosts many important guests every year, including Theo Angelopoulos, Šarūnas Bartas, Leos Carax, Nick Cave, Dardenne brothers, Lav Diaz, Bruno Dumont, Asghar Farhadi, Terry Gilliam, Amos Gitai, Peter Greenaway, Hal Hartley, Agnieszka Holland, Naomi Kawase, Abdellatif Kechiche, Kim Ki-duk, Andrey Konchalovskiy, Sebastián Lelio, Lou Ye, Dušan Makavejev, Tsai Ming-liang, Nanni Moretti, Cristian Mungiu, Gaspar Noé, Ulrike Ottinger, Carlos Saura, Béla Tarr, Peter Tscherkassky, Agnès Varda, Andrzej Wajda, Vincent Ward, and Andrzej Żuławski.

In 2016, when Wrocław was holding the title of European Capital of Culture, festival included events related to this occasion (i.e. a special section called Masters of European Cinema).

New horizons international competition winners

Grand Prix

At the beginning the festival's Grand Prix was an audience award, but since 2009 it is given by the International Jury. The first main prize selected that way was awarded to Steve McQueen's Hunger.

Audience award

Since the main prize became jury-selected in 2009, the Audience Award became a separate recognition, the second in importance. Three films managed to win both Grand Prix and Audience award: White Shadow in 2014, Bait in 2019 and The Metamorphosis of Birds in 2020.

Festival programme 2009 
 Opening gala – Michael Haneke's The White Ribbon
 Closing – Martin Provost's Séraphine
 New horizons international competition
 Films on art international competition
 New Polish films competition
 Polish short films competition
 European short films competition
 Panorama
 Special screenings
 Documentaries / Essays
 Third eye
 Midnight madness: ozploitation
 Cinema of Canada
 Cinema of Sweden
 Golden era of Hungarian cinema
 Retrospective: Tsai Ming-liang
 Retrospective: Jennifer Reeves
 Retrospective: Krzysztof Zanussi
 Retrospective: Piotr Dumała
 60 years of WFDiF
 From Polański to...
 New horizons of film language: editing
 Season 2008/2009
 Films for children
 Silent films with live music
 Screenings at the market square
 Concerts
 Exhibitions

Festival programme 2010 
 Opening gala – Xavier Beauvois' Of Gods and Men
 Closing – Francis Ford Coppola's Tetro
 New horizons international competition
 Films on art international competition
 New Polish films competition
 Polish short films competition
 European short debuts competition
 Panorama
 Special screenings
 Documentaries / Essays
 Third eye
 Midnight madness: Philippe Mora; samurai cinema
 Cinema of Turkey
 Retrospective: Jean-Luc Godard
 Retrospective: Brothers Quay
 Retrospective: Klaus Maria Brandauer
 Retrospective: Laura Mulvey
 Retrospective: Wojciech Jerzy Has
 Retrospective: Daniel Szczechura
 New horizons of film language
 Season 2009/2010
 Screenings at the market square
 Concerts
 Exhibitions

Festival programme 2011 
 Opening gala – Asghar Farhadi's A Separation
 Closing – Pedro Almodóvar's The Skin I Live In
 New horizons international competition
 Films on art international competition
 New Polish films competition
 Polish short films competition
 European short debuts competition
 Panorama
 Documentaries / Essays
 Third eye
 Special screenings
 'Round midnight
 Behind the pink curtain
 Red westerns
 Norway expanded
 New horizons of film language: production design
 Hommage: Anja Breien
 Retrospective: Bruno Dumont
 Retrospective: Werner Nekes
 Retrospective: Jack Smith
 Retrospective: Terry Gilliam
 Retrospective: Andrzej Munk
 Retrospective: Mariusz Wilczyński
 Season 2010/2011
 Films for children
 Screenings at the market square
 Concerts
 Discussion panels, workshops
 Exhibitions

Festival programme 2012 
 Opening gala – Michael Haneke's Amour
 Closing – Walter Salles' On the Road
 New horizons international competition
 Films on art international competition
 Polish short films competition
 European short films competition
 Panorama
 Special screenings
 Gdynia in Wrocław
 Documentaries / Essays
 Third eye: The Happy End. Images for the end of the world
 Midnight madness: From stage to screen
 Mockumentaries
 New horizons of film language: sound
 The Karol Irzykowski Film Studio
 Films for children
 The Cinema of Mexico
 Retrospective: Carlos Reygadas
 Retrospective: Ulrich Seidl
 Retrospective: Dušan Makavejev
 Retrospective: Peter Tscherkassky and Eve Heller
 Retrospective: Witold Giersz
 Season 2011/2012
 Screenings at the market square
 Concerts
 Discussion panels, workshops
 Exhibitions

See also
List of film festivals
American Film Festival (other film festival held in Wrocław organized by Stowarzyszenie Nowe Horyzonty)

References

External links
 New Horizons Film Festival Official website (en)

Culture in Wrocław
Film festivals in Poland
Tourist attractions in Wrocław
Film festivals established in 2001
Summer events in Poland